The Mansion Row Historic District is a national historic district located at New Albany, Indiana. It features some of the various mansions of the city when New Albany was the largest city in Indiana around the time of the American Civil War. The main section is on Main Street from State Street (where the Scribner House is), to 15th Street. A smaller section is on Market Street from E. 7th Street to E. 11th Street.

Most of the buildings are of the Federal and Italianate styles, but other styles of the mansions are of Greek Revival, Gothic Revival, and Victorian. Most of the oldest of the buildings are of the Federal style, built before Upper High Street was renamed East Main Street.

It was listed on the National Register of Historic Places in 1983.

Notable residents
Asahel Clapp (physician)
William Culbertson (merchant)
Washington C. DePauw (industrialist)
Michael C. Kerr (U.S. Speaker of the House)
William Vaughn Moody (playwright)

Prominent buildings
Dr. Asahel Clapp House (1822), first brick house in New Albany
State Bank of Indiana building (1837, Greek Revival) Built at the cost of $40,000, it was the tallest building in New Albany for a time.  It was one of the ten original branches of Indiana's State Bank.
Isaac P. Smith House (1847, Greek Revival)
Victor Pepin House (1851, Tuscan Italianate Villa), fully restored now "The Pepin Mansion" an Event & Retreat venue, original painted ceilings and more.
Sloan-Bicknell-Paris House (1851, Italian Villa), now the Admiral Bicknell Inn, it features a mahogany staircase with a cherry balustrade.
Culbertson Mansion State Historic Site (1869, Second Empire)
Washington C. DePauw House (1873, Second Empire) was the millionaire's winter home
Culbertson Old Ladies' Home (1873), built by William Culbertson for the benefit of poor widows, it is currently a bed and breakfast, the Mansion at River Walk.
Samuel Culbertson House (1887, Queen Anne), built as a wedding present from William Culbertson to his son, it now holds gatherings such as weddings and class reunions.
St. Paul's Episcopalian Church (1896, Gothic Revival)
New Albany Masonic Hall (1868 in the Italianate style)
John H. and Evan B. Stotsenburg House (1867, Italianate style), 1407 E. Main.

Gallery

See also
 Cedar Bough Place Historic District
 East Spring Street Historic District
 New Albany Downtown Historic District
 List of attractions and events in the Louisville metropolitan area

References

External links

 Community Profile, New Albany-Floyd County Consolidated Schools
 New Albany Mansion Row map and historical information, New Albany Preservation Society
 Admiral Bicknell Inn, Historical information
 Main Street Preservation Association's Walking Tour, Floyd County Historical Society

Historic districts in New Albany, Indiana
Houses in Floyd County, Indiana
Historic mansion districts
National Register of Historic Places in Floyd County, Indiana
Houses on the National Register of Historic Places in Indiana
Historic districts on the National Register of Historic Places in Indiana